The Roman Catholic Diocese of Ogdensburg covers the North Country and St. Lawrence Valley of northern New York. There are over 100 parishes in the eight-county area, which spans St. Lawrence, Jefferson, Lewis, Franklin, Clinton, Essex, and northern Herkimer and Hamilton Counties.

Adirondack Deanery 
 St. Alphonsus-Holy Name Parish (Tupper Lake) – Established in 1890 and 1904, respectively
 St. Agnes (Lake Placid) – Established in 1896
 Mission: St. Brendan's (Keene)
 St. Bernard's (Saranac Lake) – Established in 1894
 Mission: Church of the Assumption (Gabriels) – Established in 1912
 Oratories:
 St. Paul's Oratory (Bloomingdale)
 St. John's in the Wilderness (Lake Clear) – Established in 1917

Clinton Deanery 
All parishes are located in the City of Plattsburgh unless otherwise noted
 Catholic Community of Holy Name and St. Matthew (Au Sable Forks and Wilmington)
 Church of the Assumption (Redford)
 Church of the Holy Angels (Altona)
 Mission: St. Louis of France (Sciota)
 Our Lady of Victory Church] (4915 S. Catherine St.) – Established in 1907
 Roman Catholic Community of Keeseville – Formed from merger of St. John the Baptist Church and the Church of the Immaculate Conception
 Sacred Heart Church (Chazy)
 St. Alexander's (Morrisonville)
 St. Ann's−St. Joseph's (Mooers) – Established in 1992 from merger of both churches; founded in 1860 and 1911, respectively
 St. Augustine's (Peru) – Established in 1883
 Mission: St. Patrick's (West Peru)
 St. Bernard's (Lyon Mountain)
 Church of St. Dismas, the Good Thief (Dannemora) – Located in the Clinton Correctional Facility
 St. Edmund's Church (Ellenburg)
 St. James Church (Cadyville)
 St. John the Baptist Roman Catholic Church (18-20 Broad St.)
 St. John XXIII Newman Center (90 Broad St.) – Newman Center of SUNY Plattsburgh
 Oratory: St. Mary's of the Lake (Cumberland Head) – Masses are no longer celebrated here as of July 2011
 St. Joseph's Church (Dannemora)
 St. Joseph's Church (West Chazy)
 St. Mary's Church (Champlain)
 St. Patrick's Church (Rouses Point)
Oratory: St. Joseph's (Coopersville) - Mother Church of several parishes in the deanery.
 St. Peter's Church (114 Cornelia St.)

 Essex Deanery 
 Adirondack Champlain Community Parishes:
 St. Elizabeth (Elizabethtown)
 St. Philip of Jesus (Willsboro)
 St. Philip Neri/St. Joseph (Westport/Essex)
 Catholic Community of Moriah:
 Church of the Sacred Heart of Jesus (Crown Point)
 Church of All Saints (Mineville)
 St. Patrick's (Port Henry)
 Our Lady of Lourdes (Schroon Lake)
 St. Joseph's (Olmstedville)
 St. Mary's (Ticonderoga) – Established in 1844

 Franklin Deanery 
 St. Andre Bessette Parish (Malone) – Established in 2014 from the merger of the following parishes:
 Notre Dame – Established in 1869
 St. Helen's (Chasm Falls) – Established in 1877
 St. John Bosco – Established in 1935
 St. Joseph's – Established in 1848
 St. Ann's (St. Regis Falls)
 Catholic Community of Burke and Chateaugay:
 St. George Church (Burke)
 St. Patrick's (Chateaugay)
 Catholic Community of Constable, Westville and Trout River:
 St. Francis of Assisi (Constable)
 Our Lady of Fatima (Westville)
 The Catholic Community of St. Augustine's:
 St. Augustine's (North Bangor)
 St. Mary's (Brushton)
 St. Mary's of the Fort (Fort Covington)
 St. Joseph's Church (Bombay)

 Hamilton/Herkimer Deanery 
 St. Ann's (Wells)
 St. Anthony of Padua Parish (Inlet)  – Established in 1915
 Mission: St. William's Chapel (Raquette Lake) – Established in 1890; consolidated into the above parish in 2004
 St. Bartholomew's (Old Forge) – Established in 1897; place of worship rebuilt in 1991
 St. Henry's (Long Lake)
 Mission: St. Therese (Newcomb)
 St. James Major (Lake Pleasant)
 St. Mary's (Indian Lake)
 Mission: St. Paul's (Blue Mountain Lake)

 Jefferson Deanery 
 All parishes are located in the City of Watertown unless otherwise noted''
 Church of the Holy Family (129 Winthrop St.)
 Immaculate Conception Church (Brownville/Dexter)
 Our Lady of the Sacred Heart Church (320 W. Lynde St) – Established in 1838; originally a mission of St. James' Church in Carthage until 1857
 The Roman Catholic Community of Cape Vincent, Rosiere, and Chaumont:
 St. Vincent of Paul (Cape Vincent)
 St. Vincent de Paul (Rosiere)
 All Saints Church (Chaumont)
 St. Andrew's (Sackets Harbor)
 St. Anthony Parish (850 Arsenal St.)
 Yoked with St. Patrick Parish (123 S. Massey St.)
 St. Cecilia's (Adams)
 Mission: Queen of Heaven Church (Henderson)
 St. Cyril (Alexandria Bay)
 Mission: St. Francis Xavier (Redwood)
 St. James Minor (Carthage) – Established in 1821
 St. Mary's (Clayton) – Established in 1844
 Mission: St. John the Baptist (La Fargeville)
 St. Mary's (Evans Mills)
 Yoked with St. Joseph's of Philadelphia and St. Teresa's Church of Theresa
 St. Paul's (Black River)
 Yoked with St. Rita's of Deferiet

Lewis Deanery 
 St. Francis Solanus (Harrisville)
 St. Hedwig's (Houseville)
 St. Martin's (Port Leyden)
 Mission: St. John's Church (Lyons Falls)
 St. Mary's (Constableville)
 St. Mary's (Copenhagen) – Established in 1890; mission of St. James Minor of Carthage in the Jefferson Deanery
 St. Mary's (Glenfield)
 St. Mary's Nativity (West Leyden)
 St. Peter's (Lowville) – Established in 1865

St. Lawrence Deanery 
 Church of the Holy Cross (Hopkinton)
 Notre Dame (Ogdensburg)
 Parish of the Visitation and St. Raymond (Norfolk/Raymondville)
 Mission: St. Andrew's (Norwood)
 Roman Catholic Community of Morristown, Hammond and Rossie
 St. John the Evangelist (Morristown)
 St. Patrick's (Rossie)
 St. Peter's (Hammond)
 Sacred Heart Church (Edwards) – Established in 1928
 St. Hubert's (Star Lake)
 Mission: St. Michael's – Established in 1986; formerly a separate parish
 St. James (Gouverneur)
 St. John the Baptist (Madrid)
 St. Lawrence's (North Lawrence)
 St. Mary's Cathedral (Ogdensburg) – Established in 1827; mother church of the diocese
 The Roman Catholic Church of St. Mary (Potsdam)  – Established in 1898
 Mission: St. Patrick's (Colton) – Established in 1979
 St. Mary's (Canton)
 St. Mary's (Waddington)
 St. Patrick's (Brasher Falls)
 St. Peter's Parish (Massena/Louisville)
Sacred Heart/St. Lawrence
St. Mary's
 St. Raphael's (Heuvelton)
 Yoked with Sts. Philip and James (Lisbon)
 Oratory:
 St. Joseph's Oratory (Massena)

References

External links 
 Alphabetical list of parishes by town/city
 List of parishes by deanery
 

Churches
Ogdensburg